Imtiaz Sultan Jitu is a Bangladeshi professional footballer who plays as a midfielder for Dhaka Abahani. He began his professional football career with Chittagong Abahani in 2007 and appeared with the Bangladesh national team in 2010.

References

Living people
1990 births
Footballers at the 2010 Asian Games
Bangladeshi footballers
Association football midfielders
Asian Games competitors for Bangladesh
Bangladesh international footballers
Farashganj SC players
Bangladesh Football Premier League players
South Asian Games gold medalists for Bangladesh
South Asian Games medalists in football